Bradley Stephen Riddell (born 30 September 1991) is a New Zealand mixed martial artist and former kickboxer, currently competing in the Lightweight division of the Ultimate Fighting Championship (UFC).

Background
Riddell netted several kickboxing championships around New Zealand during his rise through the regional scene. He also fought professional Muay Thai and kickboxing fights, fighting to a split decision with Glory welterweight champion, Cédric Doumbé, and losing a competitive decision to ONE lightweight champion, Regian Eersel. He also has wins against  the likes of famed Aussie kickboxer John Wayne Parr.

Professional Boxing career
In November 2015, Riddell took part in the four man Super 8 Boxing Tournament in his professional boxing debut. Riddell took on Reece Papuni in the semi finals of the tournament. The ended in a draw in the third round, which lead to the fight going one extra round. Riddell lost the fight by unanimous decision.

Mixed martial arts career

Early career

Riddell made his MMA debut in an unexpected manner, having flown into Myanmar for a Muay Thai fight, but being told upon landing that it was a MMA fight. Then during his Muay Thai/Kickboxing career, he would continue to have MMA fights, mainly in the Glory of Heroes promotion, with his most notable win being a knockout of future fellow UFC fighter Kenan Song.

Ultimate Fighting Championship

Brad made his UFC career debut against fellow newcomer, Jamie Mullarkey at UFC 243 on 5 October 2019. In a fast paced fight, Riddell won the fight via unanimous decision and took home the Fight of the Night bonus.

Brad faced Magomed Mustafaev on 23 February 2020 at UFC Fight Night: Felder vs. Hooker. He won the fight via split decision.

Riddell faced Alex da Silva Coelho at UFC 253 on 27 September 2020.  He won the fight via unanimous decision.

Riddell was expected to face Gregor Gillespie on 20 March 2021 at UFC on ESPN 21. However, the day of the event the bout was postponed due to COVID-19 protocols.

Riddell faced Drew Dober on 12 June 2021 at UFC 263. He won the fight via unanimous decision. This fight earned him the Fight of the Night award.

Riddell faced Rafael Fiziev on 4 December 2021 at UFC on ESPN 31. He lost the fight via knockout in round three.

Riddell faced Jalin Turner on 2 July 2022, at UFC 276. He lost the bout via guillotine choke 45 seconds into the contest.

Riddell faced Renato Moicano on 12 November 2022 at UFC 281. He lost the bout via a rear naked choke in the first round.

After the loss, Riddell announced that he would be taking a break from MMA ‘until the fire to compete comes back’.

Championships and achievements

Mixed martial arts
Ultimate Fighting Championship
Fight of the Night (Two times) 
Wollongong Wars
Wollongong Wars Welterweight Championship (One time)

Personal life

Riddell dubbed himself “Quake” in homage to his home city of Christchurch, which was devastated by an earthquake in 2011. The disaster destroyed many of the buildings, including Riddell’s place of work, but it was also the catalyst for him moving to Auckland and building a career in combat sports.

Mixed martial arts record

|-
|Loss
|align=center|10–4
|Renato Moicano
|Submission (rear-naked choke)
|UFC 281
|
|align=center|1
|align=center|3:20
|New York City, New York, United States
|
|-
|Loss
|align=center|10–3
|Jalin Turner
|Submission (guillotine choke)
|UFC 276
| 
|align=center|1
|align=center|0:45
|Las Vegas, Nevada, United States
|
|-
|Loss
|align=center|10–2
|Rafael Fiziev 
|KO (spinning wheel kick) 
|UFC on ESPN: Font vs. Aldo
|
|align=center|3
|align=center|2:20
|Las Vegas, Nevada, United States
|
|-
|Win
|align=center|10–1
|Drew Dober
|Decision (unanimous)
|UFC 263
|
|align=center|3
|align=center|5:00
|Glendale, Arizona, United States
|
|-
|Win
|align=center| 9–1
|Alex da Silva Coelho
|Decision (unanimous)
|UFC 253
|
|align=center|3
|align=center|5:00
|Abu Dhabi, United Arab Emirates
|
|-
|Win
|align=center|8–1
|Magomed Mustafaev
|Decision (split)
|UFC Fight Night: Felder vs. Hooker 
|
|align=center|3
|align=center|5:00
|Auckland, New Zealand
|
|-
| Win
| align=center|7–1
| Jamie Mullarkey
| Decision (unanimous)
| UFC 243
| 
| align=center|3
| align=center|5:00
| Melbourne, Australia
|
|-
| Win
| align=center| 6–1
| Mikey Vaotuua
| Decision (unanimous)
| Wollongong Wars 7
| 
| align=center|3
| align=center|5:00
| Gwynneville, Australia
| 
|-
| Win
| align=center| 5–1
| Maxim Pugachev
| TKO (punches)
| Glory of Heroes 38
|
|align=Center|1
|align=center|5:00
|Shantou, China
| 
|-
| Win
| align=center| 4–1
| Shem Murdoch
| TKO (punches)
| Glory of Heroes 37
| 
| align=center| 1
| align=center| 3:42
| Auckland, New Zealand
| 
|-
| Loss
| align=center| 3–1
| Abel Brites
| Submission (armbar)
| Hex Fight Series 15
| 
| align=center| 1
| align=center| 1:05
| Perth, Australia
| 
|-
| Win
| align=center| 3–0
| Song Kenan
|TKO (punch to the body)
|Glory of Heroes 6
|
| align=center| 2
| align=center| 3:11	
|Jiyuan, China
|
|-
| Win
| align=center| 2–0
| Erruer Ye
| TKO (punches)
| Glory of Heroes: Conquest of Heroes 2
| 
| align=center| 2
| align=center| N/A
| Jiyuan, China
|
|-
| Win
| align=center| 1–0
| Gi Gean Key
| KO (punch)
| International Boxing
| 
| align=center| 1
| align=center| 2:15
| Yangon, Myanmar
|

Kickboxing record

|-  style="background:#fbb;"
| 2019-01-12|| Loss ||align=left| Rungrawee Kemmuaythaigym || EM Legend 36 || Shenzhen, China || Decision || 3 || 3:00
|-  style="background:#cfc;"
| 2018-07-28|| Win ||align=left| Rungrawee KemMuaythaigym || EM Legend 32 || Chengdu, China || Decision || 3 || 3:00
|-  style="background:#fbb;"
| 2018-04-20|| Loss ||align=left| Regian Eersel || ONE Championship: Heroes of Honor || Manila, Philippines || Decision (Unanimous)|| 3 || 3:00
|-  style="background:#cfc;"
| 2018-03-02|| Win ||align=left| Fernando Groenhart || Powerplay 36 || Victoria, Australia || Decision (Unanimous) || 5 || 3:00
|-  style="background:#fbb;"
| 2017-11-11|| Loss ||align=left|  Felix Carpintero || Glory of Heroes: China VS Spain || Madrid, Spain || Decision (Unanimous) || 3 || 3:00
|-  style="background:#fbb;"
| 2017-05-27|| Loss ||align=left| Diogo Calado|| Glory of Heroes: Portugal & Strikers League || Carcavelos, Portugal || Decision (Unanimous) || 3 || 3:00
|-
! style=background:white colspan=9 |
|-  style="background:#cfc;"
| 2017-04-01|| Win ||align=left| Janrob Strong Heart || Powerplay 33 || Victoria, Australia || Decision (Unanimous) || 5 || 3:00
|-  style="background:#cfc;"
| 2016-11 || Win ||align=left| Zhang Lipeng || Wu Lin Feng || China ||  ||  ||
|-  bgcolor="#cfc"
| 2016-10-14 || Win ||align=left| Frank Giorgi || Powerplay Promotions 31 || Australia || Decision (Split) || 5 || 3:00
|-  style="background:#cfc;"
| 2016-09-24 || Win ||align=left| Zheng Zhaoyu || Kunlun Fight 53 || Beijing, China || Ext.R Decision (Unanimous) || 4 || 3:00
|-  style="background:#fbb;"
| 2016-05-07 || Loss ||align=left| Cedric Doumbe || Glory of Heroes 2 || Shenzhen, China || Decision (Split) || 3 || 3:00
|-  style="background:#cfc;"
| 2016-03-04 || Win ||align=left| John Wayne Parr || Boonchu Cup: Caged Muay Thai 8 || Gold Coast, Australia || Decision (unanimous) || 5 || 3:00
|-  style="background:#cfc;"
| 2016|| Win ||align=left| Geng Shuguang || EM Legend  || China || Decision (Unanimous)|| 3 || 3:00
|- style="background:#cfc;"
| 2015-08-29 || Win || align="left" | Michael Badato || King in the Ring 100+ kg III || Auckland, New Zealand || Decision (Unanimous) || 3 || 3:00
|-  bgcolor="#CCFFCC"
| 2015-04-17|| Win ||align=left| Maseh Nuristani || GFC Fight Series 5 || Dubai, United Arab Emirates || TKO || 1 ||
|-  style="background:#fbb;"
| 2014-04-26 || Loss ||align=left| Steve Moxon || Kings of Kombat 12 || Dandenong, Australia ||Decision (unanimous) || 5 ||  3:00
|-  style="background:#fbb;"
|2013-11-08|| Loss ||align=left| John Wayne Parr || Powerplay Promotions 22 || Melbourne, Australia || Decision (unanimous) || 5 || 3:00
|- style="background:#fbb;"
| 2012-06-24 
| Loss
| align="left" | Yi Long
| Wu Lin Feng 
| Henan, China
| Decision 
| 3 
| 3:00 
|-
! style=background:white colspan=9 |
|- style="background:#fbb;"
| 2012-01-14 
| Loss
| align="left" | Yi Long
| Wu Lin Feng 
| Henan, China
| Decision 
| 3 
| 3:00
|- style="background:#cfc;"
| 2011-12-02 
| Win 
| align="left" | Yi Long 
| Wu Lin Feng 
| Henan, China 
| Decision 
| 3 
| 3:00
|- style="background:#fbb;"
| 2011-10-28 || Loss || align="left" | Edwin Samy || King in the Ring 72 kg I, Semi Finals || Auckland, New Zealand || ||  ||
|- style="background:#cfc;"
| 2011-10-28 || Win || align="left" | Brendan Varty || King in the Ring 72 kg I, Quarter Finals || Auckland, New Zealand || ||  ||
|- style="background:#cfc;"
| 2011-03-12 || Win || align="left" | ||  || Nelson, New Zealand || TKO (Knee) ||  || 
|-
! style=background:white colspan=9 |
|- style="background:#cfc;"
| 2010-09-17 || Win || align="left" | ||  Bangla Stadium || Thailand || KO (Straight Right) || 1 ||
|- style="background:#cfc;"
| 2010-03-13 || Win || align="left" | Jason Nuttal || Fight Sports Night 2 || Christchurch, New Zealand || TKO (Punches) || 2 ||
|- style="background:#cfc;"
| 2009-12-03 || Win || align="left" | Leon Tangaroa||  Cage Warriors 3 || New Zealand || Decision (Unanimous) || 3 || 3:00  
|-
| colspan=9 | Legend:

Boxing record

|-
|3 November 2015
|Loss
|style="text-align:left;"| Reece Papuni	
|style="text-align:left;"| Sky City Convention Centre Auckland
|
|3 (3)
|0–1
|-
| colspan=9 | Legend:

See also 
 List of male mixed martial artists

References

External links 
  
 
 

1991 births
Living people
R
New Zealand male kickboxers
New Zealand practitioners of Brazilian jiu-jitsu
Sportspeople from Christchurch
Lightweight mixed martial artists
Mixed martial artists utilizing kickboxing
Mixed martial artists utilizing boxing
Mixed martial artists utilizing Brazilian jiu-jitsu
Ultimate Fighting Championship male fighters
ONE Championship kickboxers